Maurice Fontaine (20 September 1919 – 2 January 2015) was a French politician.

Biography
He was born in 1919, and was a viticulturist. In 1965, he was elected mayor of Aigues-Mortes, a position he would hold until 1977. He ran for the position of Senator from Gard in 1971, placing second to Suzanne Crémieux. When she died in 1976, he succeeded automatically to her place. In the Senate, he was a member of the "Groupe de la Gauche démocratique".

He was not re-elected at the next election, in 1980.

References

External links
 Fontaine's page on the Senate website

1919 births
2015 deaths
Mayors of places in Occitania (administrative region)
French Senators of the Fourth Republic
French viticulturists
Senators of Gard